Central Community Schools may refer to:
 Central Community School District of Elkader, Iowa
 Central Community School System of Central, Louisiana